George Welborn Owston (7 December 1800 – 10 September 1848) was an English cricketer who was recorded in one first-class match in 1826 when he played for a combined Sheffield and Leicester team, scoring 0 runs in his only innings and holding one catch. Owston played for Leicester Cricket Club from 1821 to 1829.

References

1800 births
1848 deaths
English cricketers
English cricketers of 1826 to 1863
Leicestershire cricketers